Colour of Your Dreams is the 15th studio album by singer-songwriter Carole King, released in March 1993. The album includes "Now and Forever", a Grammy-nominated song which was featured in the film A League of Their Own.

Track listing 
All song written and composed by Carole King, except where indicated
"Lay Down My Life" – 5:14
"Hold out for Love" – 4:51
"Standing in the Rain" (Gerry Goffin, King) – 4:04
"Now and Forever" – 3:13
"Wishful Thinking" – 3:17
"Colour of Your Dreams" – 3:02
"Tears Falling Down on Me" – 4:57
"Friday's Tie-Dye Nightmare" – 4:34
"Just One Thing" – 5:04
"Do You Feel Love" – 5:24
"It's Never Too Late" (Goffin, King) – 3:41

Bonus tracks on 1993 Japanese edition
"Te Daria La Vida (Amor)" [Spanish Version of "Lay Down My Life"] (King, Cecilia Noël) – 3:50
"Lay Down My Life" [Radio Edit] – 3:47

Personnel

Musicians
Carole King – acoustic guitar, keyboards, Hammond organ, piano, synthesizer, lead vocals, backing vocals
Ted Andreadis – Hammond organ, keyboards
Robbie Kondor – synthesizer
Rudy Guess – acoustic guitar, electric guitar
Slash – lead guitar
J.J. Holiday – acoustic guitar, slide guitar
John Humphrey – bass guitar
Jerry Angel, Danny Carey, Chris Frazier – drums
Lynn Coulter – drums, percussion
Danny Pelfrey – alto saxophone, backing vocals
Jim Avery – French horn
Linda Lee Lawley – backing vocals
Leata Galloway – backing vocals

Production
Carole King & Rudy Guess – producers, mixing
Rudy Guess – engineer
John Bennett – engineer
Larry Mah – engineer
Evren Göknar – engineer
Bernie Grundman – mastering
Malcolm Pollack – mixing
Kosh – art direction, design
Robert Blakeman – photography

Charts

References

1993 albums
Carole King albums
Priority Records albums